A jump cut is a cut in film editing in which a single continuous sequential shot of a subject is broken into two parts, with a piece of footage being removed in order to render the effect of jumping forward in time. Camera positions of the subject in the remaining pieces of footage of the sequence should vary only slightly in order to achieve the effect. It is a manipulation of temporal space using the duration of a single shot, and fracturing the duration to move the audience ahead. This kind of cut abruptly communicates the passing of time as opposed to the more seamless dissolve heavily used in films predating Jean-Luc Godard's Breathless, which made extensive use of jump cuts and popularized the technique during the 1960s. For this reason, jump cuts are considered a violation of classical continuity editing, which aims to give the appearance of continuous time and space in the story-world by de-emphasizing editing, but are sometimes nonetheless used for creative purposes. Jump cuts tend to draw attention to the constructed nature of the film. More than one jump cut is sometimes used in a single sequence.

Continuity editing uses a guideline called the "30-degree rule" to avoid the appearance of jump cuts. The 30-degree rule advises that for consecutive shots to appear seamless and continuous in time, the camera position must vary at least 30 degrees from its previous position. Some schools would call for a change in framing as well (e.g., from a medium shot to a close up). The idea is to convey to the viewer a different point of view on the action but with the timeline of the action being continuous. Generally, if the camera position changes less than 30 degrees, the difference between the two shots will not be substantial enough, and the viewer will experience the edit as a jump in the position of the subject rather than a change of point of view, which is jarring. 

Jump cuts, on the other hand, keep the camera's relationship to the subject the same but jump forward in time in the action.

Although jump cuts can be created through the editing together of two shots filmed non-continuously (spatial jump cuts), they can also be created by removing a middle section of one continuously filmed shot (temporal jump cuts).

Jump cuts can add a sense of speed to the sequence of events.

History 

Georges Méliès is known as the father of the jump cut, as a result of having discovered it accidentally and then using it to simulate magical tricks; however, he tried to make the cut appear seamless to complement his illusions. The effect was used in the early film The Tempest (1908) when Ariel magically disappears and reappears. Dziga Vertof's avant-garde Russian film Man With a Movie Camera (1929) is almost entirely composed of jump cuts. Contemporary use of the jump cut largely stems from its appearance in the work of Jean-Luc Godard (at the suggestion of Jean-Pierre Melville) and other filmmakers of the French New Wave of the late 1950s and 1960s. In Godard's ground-breaking Breathless (1960), for example, he cut together shots of Jean Seberg riding in a convertible (see image) in such a way that the discontinuity between shots is emphasized and its jarring effect deliberate. In the clip above the scene abruptly changes perspective, emphasizing a gap in action. Recently the jump cut has been used in films like Snatch by Guy Ritchie, and Run Lola Run by Tom Tykwer. It is frequently used in TV editing, in documentaries produced by Discovery Channel and National Geographic Channel, for example. It is noticeable in Universal Monsters films and music videos.

Notable examples 

The jump cut has sometimes served a political use in film. It has been used as an alienating Brechtian technique (the Verfremdungseffekt) that makes the audience aware of the unreality of the film experience, in order to focus the audience's attention on the political message of a film rather than the drama or emotion of the narrative—as may be observed in some segments of Sergei Eisenstein's The Battleship Potemkin.

It was also used in Alexander Dovzhenko's Arsenal (Soviet Union, 1930), where a close-up shot of a character's face cuts closer and closer a total of nine times. Mark Cousins comments that this "fragmentation captured his indecision... and confusion", adding that "Although the effect jars, the idea of visual conflict was central to Soviet montage cinema of that time".

Jump cuts are sometimes used to show a nervous searching scene, as is done in the 2009 science fiction film Moon in which the protagonist, Sam Bell, is looking for a secret room on a moon base, and District 9 in which the protagonist, Wikus, searches for illegal objects in the house of Christopher's friend.

Jump cuts plays a significant and disorienting role in a scene of Joel and Ethan Coen's A Serious Man, in which shots of Rabbi Nachtner and Larry Gopnik having a conversation in the Rabbi's office are interspersed with shots depicting another meeting that Nachtner previously had with a different person in the same office.

In television, Rowan & Martin's Laugh-In editor Arthur Schneider won an Emmy Award in 1968 for his pioneering use of the jump cut. Jump cutting remained an uncommon TV technique until shows like Homicide: Life on the Street popularized it on the small screen in the 1990s.

The music video for "Everybody Have Fun Tonight" makes extensive use of the jump cut.

Other uses of the jump cuts include Vincent Gallo's short Flying Christ in which various shots of "Christ" jumping are cut together as he is in mid-jump, creating the illusion of flight, and in many vlogs online, as popularized by the show with zefrank.

British comedian Russell Kane has produced a series of comic, satirical videos, named "Kaneings", in response to current events. These make extensive use of jump-cut-style editing.

Confusion with other transitions

Vernacular use of the term jump cut can describe any abrupt or noticeable edit in a film. However, technically, many such over-broad usages are incorrect. In particular, a cut between two different subjects is not a true jump cut, no matter how jarring. A jump cut usually involves a jump through narrative time (as with the famous holiday greeting in Citizen Kane—a schoolboy Kane sulkily wishes his guardian "Merry Christmas", and the scene then cuts to the guardian wishing his charge, about to turn twenty-five, "and a Happy New Year") or an "elliptical" edit, wherein a shot of continuous action is broken up with a sudden cut.

See also 
 Match cut
 Smash cut

References

External links
 "Jump cut", moviesaremade.com article on jump cuts as film storytelling techniques and showcasing an array of examples from various genres of movies.
 "Avoiding Audio Jump Cuts", AskTheCameraMan.net article explaining what jump cuts in audio are and how/why to avoid them

Film editing
Cinematic techniques